Bully Creek Reservoir is a reservoir in Malheur County of the U.S. state of Oregon.  It is an impoundment of Bully Creek, a tributary of the Malheur River.

The reservoir and its dam have paved road access by Bully Creek Road from Vale W Highway. The Bully Creek park is open April through October, has 33 campsites, a day use area with two covered shelters, a swimming beach and a two-lane boat ramp with dock.

Natural history

Fish species include smallmouth bass, largemouth bass, black bass, rainbow trout, yellow perch, white, and black crappie. The reservoir is used as a resting place by migratory waterfowl with some ducks remaining to nest. Sparse vegetative cover of sagebrush and grass provides habitat for small mammals and birds.

Migrating birds flock the forested areas surrounding the reservoir. Loons, grebes, ducks, and hawks are often seen year round. Rock wrens and golden eagles are occasionally spotted in a nearby red rock formation.

See also
 List of lakes in Oregon

References

External links
  Bureau of Reclamation webpage.
  The Weather Channel.
  Angler Guide.

Reservoirs in Oregon
Rivers of Malheur County, Oregon
Buildings and structures in Malheur County, Oregon
Protected areas of Malheur County, Oregon
1963 establishments in Oregon